Secret Story - Casa dos Segredos: O Reencontro (lit. Secret Story - The House of Secrets: The Reunion) is the sixth all-stars season of the Portuguese version of the reality show Secret Story, which based on the original French version and of Big Brother. 

The season started on 29 May 2018 with Manuel Luís Goucha as the main host. In this season it was introduced a female version of "A Voz".

Housemates

Bruno F 
Bruno Fernandes was a contestant on Secret Story 7.
 Results:
 Secret Story 7: He was the 6th housemate to be evicted against Carina, Gabriela, and Nuno with 33% of the vote.
 Secret Story: O Reencontro : He was the 1st housemate to be evicted against Nuno with 48% of the vote to save.

Bruno S 
Bruno Savate was a contestant on Secret Story 5 and Secret Story: Luta Pelo Poder.
 Results:
 Secret Story 5: He was the Third Place finalist with 22% of the vote.
 Secret Story: Luta Pelo Poder: He was the winner with 42% of the vote.
 Secret Story: O Reencontro : He was the Third Place finalist with 19% of the vote.

Carina 
Carina Ferreira was a contestant on Secret Story 7.
 Results:
 Secret Story 7: She was the 13th housemate to be evicted against Isabela with 42% of the votes to save.
 Secret Story: O Reencontro : She was the Winner with 74% of the vote.

Cátia 
Cátia Melo was a contestant on Secret Story 7.
 Results:
 Secret Story 7: She was the 5th housemate to be evicted against Isabela, Luan, and Nuno with 45% of the vote.
 Secret Story: O Reencontro : She was the 2nd housemate to be evicted against Cesar, Diogo, and Nuno with 20% of the vote to save.

César 
César Matoso was a contestant on Secret Story 7.
 Results:
 Secret Story 7: He was the 10th housemate to be evicted against Gabriela, Joana F, and Rui with 47% of the vote to save.
 Secret Story: O Reencontro : He was the 3rd housemate to be evicted against Diogo and Nuno with 47% of the vote to save.

Cláudio 
Cláudio Alegre was a contestant on Secret Story 6.
 Results:
 Secret Story 6: He was the Fourth Place finalist with 4% of the vote.
 Secret Story: O Reencontro : He was the 5th housemate to be evicted against Carina, Diogo, and Sofia with 21% of the vote to save.

Cristiana 
Cristiana Jesus was a contestant on Secret Story 6.
 Results:
 Secret Story 6: She was the 14th housemate to be evicted against Amor, Carla, and Diogo with 9% of the vote to save.
 Secret Story: O Reencontro : She was the 6th housemate to be evicted against Carina, Diogo, and Sofia with 17% of the vote to save.

Diogo 
Diogo Marcelino was a contestant on Secret Story 4 and Desafio Final 3
 Results:
 Secret Story 4: He was the Third Place finalist with 12% of the vote.
 Secret Story: Desafio Final 3: He walked from the house on Day 24
 Secret Story: O Reencontro : He was the Fifth Place finalist with 5% of the vote.

Fanny 
Fanny Rodrigues was a contestant on Secret Story 2, Desafio Final 1, and Secret Story 10.
 Results:
 Secret Story 2: She was the 14th housemate to be evicted against Joao M with 89% of the vote.
 Secret Story: Desafio Final 1: She was the Fourth Place finalist with 8% of the vote.
 Secret Story 10 (France): She was the 8th housemate to be evicted against Julien with 25% of the vote to save.
 Secret Story: O Reencontro : She was the Fourth Place finalist with 13% of the vote.

Nuno 
Nuno Machado was a contestant on Secret Story 7.
 Results:
 Secret Story 7: He was the 7th housemate to be evicted against Luan, Pedro, and Tiago with 94% of the vote.
 Secret Story: O Reencontro : He was the 4th housemate to be evicted against Bruno S, Fanny, and Sofia with 48% of the vote to save.

Sofia 
Sofia Sousa was a contestant on Secret Story 4, Desafio Final 3, and Desafio Final 4.
 Results:
 Secret Story 4: She was the 2nd Place finalist with 30% of the vote.
 Secret Story: Desafio Final 3: She was the Winner with 44% of the vote.
 Secret Story: Desafio Final 4: She was the 2nd Place finalist with 34% of the vote.
 Secret Story: O Reencontro : She was the 2nd Place finalist with 26% of the vote.

Secrets 
In this All-Stars season there was one secret:

Nominations table

Notes 
 :   In Day 1, the 5 female housemates were the first ones to enter the house. Outside the house, there were 5 male housemates and the females voted, in two rounds, which males would enter. Cláudio was chosen in the first round and César in the second (chosen by Cátia, in a tie against Bruno S.). Then, the public voted, via the app, between Bruno F., Bruno S. and Nuno to decide who would be the next to enter. With 65% of the votes, Bruno S. was chosen to enter the house. At the end of the night, Bruno F. and Nuno also entered the house, however, they were automatically nominated for the first eviction.
 :  Before week 1's eviction took place, the first round of nominations for week 2 took place face-to-face in the living room. Everyone could be nominated exempt the nominees at the time (Bruno and Nuno).
 :  César was automatically nominated for having the reddest bracelets (which means he failed the most at secrets missions and "A Voz"'s orders).
 : At the end of the vote, Diogo, César and Cátia were already nominated. However, there was a tie for the fourth nominee between Nuno and Sofia with 3 votes each. As a result, there was a random draw to determine who would break the tie. Cláudio was chosen and nominated Nuno.
 : After passing a task, Carina was given the power to decide which housemate would have a double vote and whose vote would be nullified at next week's nominations. She decided that Bruno S. would have a double vote and Diogo would be banned from nominating.
 :  Diogo was given immunity for having the most green bracelets.
 : At this week's nominations, the housemates could only nominate the opposite gender. At the end of the vote, Fanny, Sofia and Nuno were already nominated. However, there was a tie for the fourth nominee between Cláudio and Bruno S. with 2 votes each. As a result, there was a random draw between the females to determine who would break the tie. Cristiana was chosen and nominated Bruno S.
 :  At the start of the live show of week 3's eviction, the 4 non-nominated housemates (Carina, Cristiana, Cláudio and Diogo) were able to be given an automatic nomination for next week. This would be done by successive save rounds in which the housemates at risk would have a decision unanimously. As that never happened, the currently nominated housemates decided who would be saved. In the first round, they saved Diogo, at the second round they saved Cláudio, and finally, in the third round, they saved Cristiana. This left Carina to be automatically nominated.
 :  A Chinese houseguest Felicia entered the house on Day 20 with the mission of making the housemates believe she only spoke Chinese. As she passed her mission, she was given the power to evict one of the housemates and she chose Sofia. However, as she was just a houseguest, Sofia just became automatically nominated with Felicia also leaving the house on Day 22.
 : At the end of the vote, Carina, Sofia and Cláudio were already nominated. However, there was a tie for the fourth nominee between Cristiana and Diogo with 3 votes each. As a result, there was a random draw to determine who would break the tie. Bruno S. was chosen and nominated Diogo.
 : For the special last nominations round of the season, everyone nominated face-to-face. A special last eviction would take place that same day on the eviction show.
 : For the finale, the public voted for who they wanted to win.

Nominations total received

Nominations: results 

 Votes to save
 Votes to win

Twists

Heaven and Hell 
Housemates were divided between 2 bedrooms throughout the game, in which they would win advantages or disadvantages in the game according to their position, mostly seen on the nominations process. Housemates switch bedrooms each week:

Bracelets 
In this All-Stars season instead of money accounts, each housemate can receive bracelets according to their stay and missions they accomplish in the house which has different colors with different meanings. A green bracelet has a positive meaning for the game and having 5 of them exchanges for a white bracelet. In other hands, a red bracelet has a negative meaning and having 5 of them exchanges for a black bracelet. They usually have a major impact in the nominations process:
Week 2 - By having the reddest bracelets, César was automatically nominated.
Week 3 - By having the greenest bracelets, Diogo was given immunity.

Ratings

Live eviction shows

References

External links 
 Official Website 
 Fan Website 

2018 Portuguese television seasons
O Reencontro